Sandro Isidoro Azenha (born ) is a Portuguese futsal player who plays as a goalkeeper for MTBA after a short stint at Belenenses in late 2018. Sandro has also been capped once for the Portugal national team.

References

External links

Sandro Azenha at playmakerstats.com (formerly thefinalball.com)

1988 births
Living people
People from Sintra
Futsal goalkeepers
Portuguese men's futsal players
Sporting CP futsal players
C.F. Os Belenenses futsal players
Sportspeople from Lisbon District